Simon Milton (born 23 August 1963) is an English former professional footballer and academy co-ordinator at Ipswich Town.

As a player, he was a midfielder from 1986 until 1997. During his career he made over 300 appearances for Ipswich Town. He also played for Bury Town, Exeter City, Torquay United and Braintree Town.

Playing career
Although born in London, Milton moved to Thetford as a teenager and began his career as junior with local side Thetford Rovers. He had unsuccessful trials with Norwich City and Cambridge United and began his senior career with Thetford before joining another local non-league side, Bury Town. He played for Thetford in a friendly against Ipswich Town and impressed Ipswich manager Bobby Ferguson enough to earn a trial. Soon after, he was offered a professional contract, but then Ferguson was replaced by John Duncan. Duncan honoured the offer and Milton moved to Ipswich from Bury Town for a fee of £5,000.

He made his Ipswich debut on 28 December 1987 in a 4–2 defeat away to Swindon Town. He was loaned out to Devon sides Exeter City and Torquay United before becoming a regular with Ipswich. He was voted Ipswich's player of the year in 1996 and retired from playing professionally in 1997.

Coaching career
In 1998, he joined the coaching staff at Ipswich Town's academy.

Honours
Ipswich Town
Football League Second Division: 1991–92

Individual
Ipswich Town Player of the Year: 1995–96
Ipswich Town Hall of Fame: Inducted 2016

References

Further reading

External links 

Living people
1963 births
Association football midfielders
English footballers
Premier League players
Bury Town F.C. players
Ipswich Town F.C. players
Exeter City F.C. players
Torquay United F.C. players
Braintree Town F.C. players
Footballers from Fulham